Mt. Moriah Lodge No. 7, is a historic building located in Jessup, Maryland. It is a two-story lodge constructed in the late 19th century.

The two-story building was constructed in a predominantly African American community along Guilford road, one of the "rolling roads" for hand-rolled barrel shipment of tobacco to market in Annapolis, Maryland. The building was constructed in conjunction with Asbury United Methodist Church built prior to 1860.

The building is a wood sided two-story gable front building constructed on brick columns. The bottom floor was open for community use. The side yard has a shared cemetery for Lodge members with a mix of marked and unmarked graves. The building resides on a half acre lot provided by Cornelius and Catherine Mack for $16 in 1896. An adjoining lot to the church was set aside for a colored school, which was not built. The modern Maryland Route 32 built in the 1960s parallels Guilford Road and is considered detrimental to the historical character of the site. In a 2003 historical inventory, the building was listed as vacant and had significant roof damage from a fallen tree and the property boundaries were reduced to a quarter acre.

References

External links
Images of the Mt Moriah Lodge No. 7

African-American history of Howard County, Maryland
Houses completed in 1896
Howard County, Maryland landmarks
Houses in Howard County, Maryland
Jessup, Maryland
Clubhouses in Maryland